Tamphana inferna is a moth in the Bombycidae family. It was described by Paul Dognin in 1916. It is found in South America. The type location is Goldsberg.

References

Natural History Museum Lepidoptera generic names catalog

Bombycidae
Moths described in 1916